The Aventurier-class destroyers were a group of four destroyers built during the early 1910s. Originally ordered by Argentina, they were taken over by the French Navy when the First World War began in August 1914, completed with French armament and renamed.

Design and description 
The Aventurier-class ships were significantly larger and more heavily armed than other French destroyers of the period. Their crew numbered 140 men.

The ships were powered by a pair of Rateau steam turbines, each driving one propeller shaft using steam provided by five mixed-firing Foster-Wheeler boilers.

The primary armament of the Aventurier-class ships consisted of four  guns in single mounts, one on the forecastle, one between the funnels, and two on the quarterdeck, in front and behind the searchlight platform. They were fitted with a  AA gun for anti-aircraft defence. The ships were also equipped with four single mounts for  torpedo tubes amidships.

Ships

Citations

References
 
 

 
Destroyer classes
Destroyers of the French Navy
 
Ship classes of the French Navy